Salvation overwhelmed enlightenment, or national salvation crushed enlightenment, the country's salvation suffocated the enlightenment, is a viewpoint put forward by Li Zehou in the mid-1980s in an article entitled Double Variation on Enlightenment and National Salvation. However, the American scholar Vera Schwarcz argued that she was in fact the one who raised this idea before Li.

Definition
In Double Variation on Enlightenment and National Salvation, Li Zehou deconstructed modern Chinese history with the two different themes of intellectual history: "enlightenment" and "salvation". In the process of modern Chinese history, cultural enlightenment task of "anti-feudalism" was "interrupted" by the theme of national salvation, and the revolutionary and salvation movements not only failed to continue to advance the work of cultural enlightenment, but were also "quietly infiltrated by the old traditional ideology", which eventually caused the Cultural Revolution to "push Chinese consciousness into the desperate situation of full resurrection of feudal traditions". Briefly, national crises and collective causes eventually submerged the values of individual freedom advocated by the protagonists of the Enlightenment.

In 1989, Li again clearly pointed out that the direction of modern Chinese history in the twentieth century was that "salvation overwhelmed enlightenment, and the peasant revolution overwhelmed modernization". He further argued that if salvation overwhelmed enlightenment during the revolutionary era, then today enlightenment is salvation, and the only way to make the country rich and strong and modern is to fight for democracy, freedom, reason, and the rule of law.

According to the Chinese historian Qin Hui, "salvation overwhelmed enlightenment" actually means nationalism overwhelmed liberalism, and helped the rise of Marxism and Leninism.

References 

Historiography of China